Daniel Stein (born December 24, 1983 in North Vancouver, British Columbia) is a male water polo player from Canada. He was a member of the Canada men's national water polo team, that claimed the bronze medal at the 2007 Pan American Games in Rio de Janeiro, Brazil.

References
 Canadian Olympic Committee

1983 births
Living people
Canadian male water polo players
Sportspeople from North Vancouver
University of Calgary alumni
Pan American Games bronze medalists for Canada
Pan American Games medalists in water polo
Water polo players at the 2007 Pan American Games
Medalists at the 2007 Pan American Games